The following is a list of notable events and releases of the year 1999 in Norwegian music.

Events

January
 29 – The 2nd Polarjazz started in Longyearbyen, Svalbard (February 29 – 31).

February
 27 – The annual By:Larm festival started in Stavanger, Norway.

March
 26 – The 26th Vossajazz started in Voss, Norway (March 26 – 28).

April
 28 –  The Ole Blues festival started in Bergen (April 28 – May 2).

May
 12 – The 10th MaiJazz started in Stavanger, Norway (May 12 – 16).
 13 – The 27th Nattjazz started in Bergen, Norway (May 13 – 29).

June
 26 – The 1st Øyafestivalen started at Kalvøya near by Oslo (June 26 – 27).
 30 – The 35th Kongsberg Jazzfestival started in Kongsberg, Norway (June 30 – July 3).

July
 12 – The 39th Moldejazz started in Molde, Norway (July 12 – 17).

August
 9 – The 14th Oslo Jazzfestival started in Oslo, Norway (August 9 – 15).
 11 – The 13th Sildajazz started in Haugesund, Norway (August 11 – 15).

Unknown date
 The Core was initiated by drummer Espen Aalberg.

Albums released

Unknown date

K
 Karin Krog
 Bluesand (Meantime Records), with John Surman

Deaths

 February
 16 – Johan Kvandal, composer (born 1919).

March
 14 – Marius Müller, guitarist, singer, and songwriter, car crash (born 1958).
 28 – Jens Book Jenssen, popular singer, songwriter, revue artist, and theatre director (born 1910).

April
 27 – Gunnar Brunvoll, impresario and opera administrator (born 1924).

August
 6 – Pernille Anker, actor and singer (born 1947).

December
 30 – Gunnar Germeten Jr., composer (born 1947).

 Unknown date
 Arne Sletsjøe, classical violist (born 1916).

See also
 1999 in Norway
 Music of Norway
 Norway in the Eurovision Song Contest 1999
 1999 in jazz

References

 
Norwegian music
Norwegian
Music
1990s in Norwegian music